In Greek mythology, Eriboea (Ancient Greek: Ἐρίβοια), also Eeriboea (Ἠερίβοια) were the name of the following figures:
 Eriboea, second wife of Aloeus and daughter of Eurymachus, son of Hermes.
Eriboea, alternate name for Periboea, wife of Telamon and mother of Ajax the Lesser.
Eriboea, one of the Amazons. She was killed by the hero Heracles.

Notes

References 

 Diodorus Siculus, The Library of History translated by Charles Henry Oldfather. Twelve volumes. Loeb Classical Library. Cambridge, Massachusetts: Harvard University Press; London: William Heinemann, Ltd. 1989. Vol. 3. Books 4.59–8. Online version at Bill Thayer's Web Site
 Diodorus Siculus, Bibliotheca Historica. Vol 1-2. Immanel Bekker. Ludwig Dindorf. Friedrich Vogel. in aedibus B. G. Teubneri. Leipzig. 1888–1890. Greek text available at the Perseus Digital Library.
 Tzetzes, John, Allegories of the Iliad translated by Goldwyn, Adam J. and Kokkini, Dimitra. Dumbarton Oaks Medieval Library, Harvard University Press, 2015. 

Amazons (Greek mythology)
Thessalian characters in Greek mythology
Salaminian mythology